This list of the prehistoric life of West Virginia contains the various prehistoric life-forms whose fossilized remains have been reported from within the US state of West Virginia.

Precambrian
The Paleobiology Database records no known occurrences of Precambrian fossils in West Virginia.

Paleozoic

Selected Paleozoic taxa of West Virginia
  †Alethopteris
 †Alethopteris decurrens
 †Alethopteris gigas
 †Alethopteris grandini
 †Alethopteris parva
 †Alethopteris serlii
 †Alethopteris sternberg
 †Alethopteris virginiana
 †Aneurophyton – or unidentified related form
  †Annularia
 †Annularia asteris
 †Annularia galoides
 †Annularia mucronata
 †Annularia radiata
 †Annularia sphenophylloides
 †Annularia stellata
  †Archaeopteris
 †Archaeopteris halliana
 †Archaeopteris hibernica
 †Archaeopteris macilenta
 †Archaeopteris obusa
 †Archaeopteris sphenophyllifolia
 †Artisia
 †Athyris
 †Atrypa
 †Atrypa reticularis – report made of unidentified related form or using admittedly obsolete nomenclature
 †Aulopora
  †Aviculopecten
 †Aviculopecten batesvillensis
 †Aviculopecten crenistriatus – or unidentified comparable form
 †Baiera
 †Barinophyton
 †Bassipterus
 †Calamites
 †Calamites cistii
 †Calamites suckowi
 †Calamites suckowii
  †Callipteridium
 †Callipteridium dawsonianum
 †Callipteridium grandifolium
 †Callipteridium oblongifolium
 †Callipteridium odontopteroides
 †Callipteridium unitum
 †Callipteris
 †Callipteris conferta
 †Callipteris currettiensis
 †Callipteris diabolica
 †Callipteris lyratifolia
 †Callixylon
 †Callixylon erianum
 †Calymene
 †Calymene camerata
 †Calymene cresapensis
  †Calymene niagarensis
 †Camarotoechia
 †Camarotoechia andrewsi
 †Camarotoechia limitare
 †Camarotoechia litchfieldensis
 †Camarotoechia tonolowayensis
 †Cardiocarpus
 †Carniodus
 †Chonetes
 †Chonetes novascoticus
 †Cordaites
 †Cordaites principalis
 †Cornulites
  †Crassigyrinus
 †Cyclopteris
 †Dalmanites
 †Dalmanites limulurus
 †Diploceraspis
 †Diploceraspis burkei
 †Distomodus
 †Drepanopterus
  †Edaphosaurus
 †Edaphosaurus colohistion – type locality for species
 †Edmondia
 †Eucalyptocrinites
 †Eurypterus
 †Favosites
  †Greererpeton
 †Greererpeton burkemorani
 †Gyracanthus
 †Holopea
 †Hughmilleria
  †Lepidodendron
 †Lepidodendron aculeatum
 †Lepidodendron dichotomum
 †Lepidodendron obovatum
 †Limnopus
 †Limnopus glenshawensis
 †Lingula
 †Lithostrotion
 †Lyginopteris
 †Lyginopteris bermudensiformis
 †Lyginopteris fragilis
 †Lyginopteris hoeninghausi
 †Modiolus
 †Mucrospirifer
 †Mucrospirifer mucronatus
 †Murchisonia
  †Neuropteris
 †Neuropteris auriculata
 †Neuropteris cordata
 †Neuropteris fimbriata
 †Neuropteris flexuosa
 †Neuropteris gigantea
 †Neuropteris heterophylla
 †Neuropteris hirsuta
 †Neuropteris loschii
 †Neuropteris odontopteroides
 †Neuropteris ovata
 †Neuropteris scheuchzeri
 †Neuropteris sternberg
  †Onychodus
 †Orthacanthus – or unidentified comparable form
 †Orthoceras – report made of unidentified related form or using admittedly obsolete nomenclature
 †Parahughmilleria
  †Pecopteris
 †Pecopteris arborescens
 †Pecopteris elliptica
 †Pecopteris feminaeformis
 †Pecopteris hemitelioides
 †Pecopteris hemiteloides
 †Pecopteris pennaeformis – or unidentified comparable form
 †Pecopteris unita
  †Periechocrinus
 †Petalodus
 †Phacops
 †Phacops cristata
 †Pinna
 †Platyceras
 †Platyceras gebharti
 †Platyceras magnificum
 †Proterogyrinus
 †Proterogyrinus scheelei
  †Protorothyris – type locality for genus
 †Protorothyris morani – type locality for species
 †Rhodea
 †Sagenodus – or unidentified comparable form
 †Sigillaria
 †Sigillaria approximata
 †Sigillaria brardii
 †Solenomorpha
  †Sphenophyllum
 †Sphenophyllum angustifolium
 †Sphenophyllum cornutum
 †Sphenophyllum cuneifolium
 †Sphenophyllum emarginatum
 †Sphenophyllum majus
 †Sphenophyllum oblongifolia
 †Sphenophyllum subtenerrimmum
 †Sphenophyllum tenuifolium
 †Sphenopteris
 †Sphenopteris coriacea
  †Spirifer – report made of unidentified related form or using admittedly obsolete nomenclature
 †Spirifer corallinensis
 †Spirifer keyserensis
 †Spirifer mackenzicus
 †Spirifer vanuxemi
 †Stigmaria
 †Tentaculites
 †Tetracystis
 †Tetrameroceras
 †Trimerus
 †Waeringopterus
 †Wilkingia
 †Wurmiella
 †Wurmiella excavata
  †Zatrachys

Mesozoic
The Paleobiology Database records no known occurrences of Mesozoic fossils in West Virginia.

Cenozoic

 Agkistrodon
  †Agkistrodon contortrix
 †Allophaiomys
 †Allophaiomys pliocaenicus
 †Ambystoma
  †Ambystoma jeffersonianum
 †Ambystoma maculatum
 †Ambystoma tigrinum
 †Atopomys
 †Atopomys texensis
 Blarina
 †Blarina bravicauda
  †Blarina brevicauda
 †Blarina brevicuda
 †Blarine
 †Blarine brevicauda
 †Bootherium
  †Bootherium bombifrons
 †Brachyprotoma
 †Brachyprotoma obtusata
 Bufo
 †Bufo americanus
 †Bufo woodhousei
 Canis
  †Canis dirus
 †Canis latrans
 Carphophis
 †Carphophis amoenus
 Castor
 †Castor canadensis
 †Cenis
 †Cenis latrans
 Cervus
  †Cervus elaphus
 Clethrionomys
 †Clethrionomys gapperi
 Coluber
  †Coluber constrictor
 Condylura
 †Condylura cristata
 †Condylura crystata
 Crotalus
 †Crotalus horridus
 Cryptobranchus
  †Cryptobranchus alleganiensis
 †Cryptobranchus guildayi
 Cryptotis
 †Cryptotis parva
 †Cryptotis pava
  Desmodus
 †Desmodus stocki
 Desmognathus
 †Desmognathus fuscus
 †Desmognathus monticola
 †Desmognathus ochrophaeus
 Dicrostonyx
 †Dicrostonyx hudsonius
 †Dipoides
 †Ectopistes
  †Ectopistes migratorius
 Elaphe
 †Elaphe vulpina
 Eptesicus
 †Eptesicus fuscus
 Equus
 Erethizon
 †Erethizon dorsatum
 Eumeces
 †Eumeces fasciatus
 †Eumeces laticeps
 Eutamias
 †Eutamias minimus – or unidentified comparable form
 Geomys
 †Geomys bursarius – or unidentified comparable form
 Glaucomys
 †Glaucomys sabrinus
 Gyrinophilus
  †Gyrinophilus porphyriticus
  Heterodon
 †Heterodon platyrhinos
 Hyla
 †Hyla chrysoscelis
 †Hyla crucifer
  Ictalurus
 Lampropeltis
 †Lampropeltis triangulum
 Lasiopodomys
 †Lasiopodomys deceitensis
 Lasiurus
 †Lasiurus borealis
 Lepus
  †Lepus americanus
 Lynx
 †Lynx rufus
 †Mammut
  †Mammut americanum
 †Mammuthus
 Marmota
 †Marmota monax
 †Megalonyx
  †Megalonyx jeffersonii
 †Megalonyx jerrersonii – or unidentified comparable form
 Mephitis
 †Mephitis mephitis
 Microtus
 †Microtus chrotorrhinus
 †Microtus hibbardi
 †Microtus llanensis
 †Microtus ochrogaster – or unidentified comparable form
 †Microtus paroperarius
 †Microtus pennsylvanicus
 †Microtus pinetorum
 †Microtus xanthognathus
 Mictomys
 †Mictomys borealis
 †Mimomys
 †Mimomys virginianus
  †Miracinonyx
 †Miracinonyx inexpectatus
 Mustela
 †Mustela americana
 †Mustela armines
 †Mustela fenata – or unidentified comparable form
 †Mustela frenata – or unidentified comparable form
  †Mustela nivalis
 †Mustela vison
  †Mylohyus
 †Mylohyus fossilis
 Myodes
 †Myodes gaperi
 Myotis
 †Myotis grisescens – tentative report
 †Myotis keeni
 †Myotis keenii
 †Myotis leibi
 †Myotis leibii
 Napaeozapus
 †Napaeozapus insignis
 Neofiber
 †Neofiber alleni – or unidentified comparable form
 †Neofiber leonardi
 Neotoma
  †Neotoma floridana
 †Neotoma spelaea
 Nerodia
 †Nerodia sipedon
 Notophthalmus
  †Notophthalmus viridescens
 Ochotona
 †Ochotone
 Odocoileus
  †Odocoileus virginianus
 †Ondarta
 †Ondarta ziebethicus
 Ondatra
 †Ondatra annectens
 †Ondatra zibethicus
 Opheodrys
 †Opheodrys vernalis
 Panthera
  †Panthera onca
 †Parascalopis
 †Parascalopis breweri
 Parascalops
 †Parascalops breweri
 †Parascalopuis
 †Parascalopuis breweri
  Pekania
 †Pekania pennanti
 Peromyscus
 †Peromyscus cumberlandensis
 †Peromyscus maniculatus – or unidentified comparable form
 Phenacomys
 †Phenacomys brachyodus
 †Phenacomys intermedis
 †Phenacomys intermedius
  Pipistrellus
 †Pipistrellus subflavus
 Pitymys
 †Pitymys cumberlandensis
  †Platygonus
 †Platygonus compressus
 †Platygonus vetus
 Plecotus
 †Plesiothomomys
 Procyon
 †Procyon lotor
 †Rana
 †Rana catesbeina
 †Rana clamitans
 †Rana pipiens
 †Rana sylvatica
 Rangifer
  †Rangifer tarandus
 Salamandra
 †Salamandra opaca
 Sceloporus
  †Sceloporus undulatus
 Sciuropterus
 †Sciuropterus volans
 Sciurus
 †Sciurus carolinensis – or unidentified comparable form
 †Sciurus carolinensus
 †Sciurus corolinensis
 Sistrurus
 †Sistrurus catenatus
  †Smilodon
 †Smilodon fatalis
 †Smilodon gracilis
 Sorex
 †Sorex arcticus
 †Sorex cinereus
 †Sorex cinerus
 †Sorex dispar
 †Sorex fumeus
 †Sorex hoyi
  †Sorex palustris
 Spermophilus
 †Spermophilus tridecemlineatus
 Spilogale
  †Spilogale putorius – or unidentified comparable form
 Storeria
 Sylvilagus
 †Sylvilegus – or unidentified comparable form
 Synaptomys
 †Synaptomys cooperi
 Tadarida
 †Tadarida brasiliensis – or unidentified comparable form
 Tamias
 †Tamias striatus
 Tamiasciurus
 †Tamiasciurus hudsonicus
 †Tamies
 †Tamies striatus
  Tapirus
 Taxidea
 †Taxidea taxus
 Thamnophis
 Thomomys
 †Thomomys potomacensis
 Urocyon
 †Urocyon cinereoargenteus
 Ursus
 †Ursus americanus
 Vulpes
  †Vulpes vulpes
 Zapus
 †Zapus hudsonius

References
 

West Virginia